The Mouse on the Mayflower is a 1968 animated Thanksgiving television special created by Rankin/Bass Productions and animated by Japanese studio Toei Animation. It was the first official special under the Rankin/Bass moniker after changing its name from Videocraft the previous year. It debuted on NBC on November 23, 1968. The special is about a church mouse named Willum, who is discovered on the Mayflower. Tennessee Ernie Ford voices Willum Mouse, Esq. and narrates.

Plot
The famous ship called Mayflower is trapped amidst a huge storm. The entire story is narrated by a church-mouse called Willum, from his viewpoint. The tale begins with the pilgrim preachers deciding to move to America and getting aboard the Mayflower. However, because of the huge storm, the ship gets on the verge of sinking. Then, Willum, the pilgrim mouse, comes up with an idea to save the ship.

When the pilgrims land safely, they write the Mayflower Compact and start constructing their new church and colony. However, it is already the autumn season and they do not have much food stored for the winter. The pilgrims then learn to plant crops during the spring season and celebrate a big feast toward the onset of the autumn season or fall. This is their first Thanksgiving celebration.

Cast
 Tennessee Ernie Ford as Narrator, Willum Mouse, Esq.
 Eddie Albert as Captain Standish
 John Gary as John Alden
 Joanie Sommers as Priscilla Mullins

Additional voices
 Paul Frees - Thunder Mouse, Captain Jones, Scurve, Quizzler, Smiling Buzzard, Pilgrims, Sailors
 June Foray - Charity Blake, Pilgrims

Crew
 Producers/Directors: Jules Bass, Arthur Rankin, Jr.
 Writer: Romeo Muller
 Music: Maury Laws
 Lyrics: Jules Bass
 Animation Production: Toei Animation (as Toei Studios)
 Key Animation: Hayao Miyazaki (uncredited)
 Musical Director: Maury Laws
 Recording Supervision: Jim Harris, Phil Kaye

Home media
The Mouse on the Mayflower was first released on VHS by Family Home Entertainment in 1989 and 1993. Sony Wonder and Golden Books Family Entertainment also released the special on VHS in the Holiday Classics Collection line in 1998.

References

External links

 

1968 animated films
1968 in American television
1968 television specials
1960s American television specials
1960s animated television specials
Films scored by Maury Laws
Television shows directed by Jules Bass
Television shows directed by Arthur Rankin Jr.
Animated films about mice
Films set in the 1620s
Films set in Massachusetts
Films set in the Thirteen Colonies
Films set on ships
Mayflower
NBC television specials
Thanksgiving television specials
Rankin/Bass Productions television specials
Television shows written by Romeo Muller
1960s American films